Tufa may refer to:

Tufa, a variety of limestone
Tufa, Germanic warrior active in 5th century Italy
North Dock Tufa, petrified tufa formation in Sunderland, England
Caerwys Tufa, preserved tufa formation in Clwyd, Wales
Mono Lake Tufa State Natural Reserve, natural reserve in California, United States
Tufa River, a tributary of the Prahova River in Romania
Tufa, the founding family of Southern Liang, a state during the Chinese Jin Dynasty
Tufa Wugu (died 399), founding prince of Southern Liang
Tufa Lilugu (died 402), second ruler of Southern Liang
Tufa Rutan (365–415), last ruling prince of Southern Liang
Princess Tufa (died 423), daughter of Tufa Rutan
Tufa (Amharic: ቱፋ), a male given name of Ethiopian origin
Firehiwot Tufa Dado (born 1984), Ethiopian marathon runner
Mestawet Tufa (born 1983), Ethiopian long-distance runner
Tufa, a summer settlement in Çaykara district of Trabzon province, Turkey.
Tufa, a fictional clan of fairies in Alex Bledsoe's fantasy novel, The Hum and the Shiver

Ethiopian given names
Amharic-language names